Christ Church, Malacca is an 18th-century Dutch-built Anglican church (originally Dutch Reformed) in the city of Malacca City, Malaysia. It is the oldest functioning Protestant church in Malaysia and is within the jurisdiction of the Lower Central Archdeaconry of the Anglican Diocese of West Malaysia.

History

The Dutch conquest of Malacca from the Portuguese Empire in 1641 saw the proscription of Roman Catholicism and the conversion of existing churches to Dutch Reformed use. The old St. Paul's Church at the summit of St. Paul Hill was renamed the Bovenkerk (Upper Church) and used as the main parish church of the Dutch community.

In 1741, in commemoration of the centenary of the capture of Malacca from the Portuguese, the Dutch burgher community decided to build a new church to replace the ageing Bovenkerk. The foundation stone was laid by the Malacca born Captain of the Malacca Burghers, Abraham de Wind, on behalf of his father, Claas de Wind, a prominent Burgher who had been the Secunde (Deputy Governor) of Malacca. The church was completed 12 years later in 1753 and replaced the Bovenkerk as the primary Dutch Reformed Church in Dutch Malacca.

With the signing of the Anglo-Dutch Treaty of 1824, possession of Malacca was transferred to the British East India Company and in 1838, the church was re-consecrated with the rites of the Church of England by Daniel Wilson, Bishop of Calcutta and renamed Christ Church. The maintenance of the church was taken over by the Government of the Straits Settlements in 1858.

Originally painted white, the church and the neighbouring Stadthuys building was painted red in 1911 and this distinctive colour scheme has remained the hallmark of Malacca's Dutch-era buildings since.

Architecture

The roof is covered with Dutch tiles and the walls were raised using Dutch bricks built on local laterite blocks then coated with Chinese plaster. The floors of the church are paved with granite blocks originally used as ballast for merchant ships.

The original Dutch windows were reduced and ornamented after the British takeover of Malacca and the porch and vestry were built only in the mid-19th century.

Artifacts

Tombstones and memorial plaques
The floors of the church also incorporate various tombstones with Portuguese and Armenian inscriptions used as paving blocks. Memorial plaques in Dutch, Armenian and English also adorn the interior of the church. Some Armenian inscriptions provide an interesting panorama of life in the Dutch period:

Greetings, you who are reading this tablet of my tomb in which I now sleep. Give me the news, the freedom of my countrymen, for them I did much weep. If there arose among them one good guardian to govern and keep. Vainly I expected the world to see a good shepherd came to look after the scattered sheep.

I, Jacob, grandson of Shamier, an Armenian of a respectable family whose name I keep, was born in Persia near Inefa, where my parents now forever sleep. Fortune brought me to distant Malacca, which my remains in bondage to keep. Separated from the world on 7th July 1774 A.D. at the age of twenty-nine, my mortal remains were deposited in this spot of the ground which I purchased.

Church bell
The church bell is inscribed with the date 1698 suggesting that it was used for another purpose prior to the completion of the church.

Church administration records
The church's collection of Kerk Boek (Church Book), Resolutie Boek (Resolution Book), Rapporten (Reports) as well as the Doop Boek (Baptism Register) going back to the earliest Dutch times in Malacca have survived through the centuries. These antiquated documents are now being kept at the National Archives of Malaysia.

Silver altar vessels
Silver altar vessels dating back to the early Dutch period are also in the possession of the church but is kept in storage and rarely taken out for display.

Altar Bible
The altar Bible has a cover made of brass inscribed with the passage from John 1:1 in Dutch.

Service
2 Sunday services are held in this church (English 8.30am, Mandarin 10.30am)

See also
 Church of the Province of South East Asia
 Dutch Reformed Church
 Dutch Malacca
 Dutch East India Company

References

Notations

External links

 Diocese of West Malaysia

Melaka
Buildings and structures associated with the Dutch East India Company
Churches completed in 1753
Churches in Malacca
Former properties of the Dutch East India Company
Protestantism in Malaysia
Dutch colonial architecture